The Kansas City Club, founded in 1882 and located in the Library District of Downtown Kansas City, Missouri, USA, was the oldest  gentlemen's club in Missouri. The club began admitting women members in 1975. Along with the River Club on nearby Quality Hill, it was one of two surviving private city clubs on the Missouri side of Kansas City. Notable members  included Presidents Harry Truman and Dwight D. Eisenhower, General Omar Bradley, and political boss Tom Pendergast. It ceased operation in 2015.

Clubhouse

The club is located in a neoclassical masonry and reinforced concrete building at 918 Baltimore Avenue, which was designed by John McKecknie and built in 1922. It is situated at the corner of Ninth Street across Baltimore Avenue from the Central Library and across Ninth Street from the New York Life Building. The clubhouse was home to the University Club of Kansas City from 1922 to 2001 (see below).

The four-story clubhouse contained a dining room, a pub, a library, a cigar stand, full-service athletic facilities, and banquet and meeting facilities including a lounge, a ballroom, and private conference rooms. Two "inner clubs" had their own private lounge and bar spaces for their own members. The athletic facilities included cardio, weight, and strength training equipment, a trainer, a masseuse, hot tubs, steam rooms, saunas, a racquetball court, and two squash courts. Along with the University of Missouri-Kansas City and the Pembroke Hill School, the Kansas City Club was one of only three locations in Kansas City with squash facilities.

History

In the period after the Civil War, most of Kansas City’s existing social clubs were pro-Confederate.  A group of prominent local businessmen and professionals, including Edward H. Allen, Victor B. Bell, Alden J. Blethen, Thomas B. Bullene, Gardiner Lathrop, August Meyer, Leander J. Talbott, William Warner, and Robert T. Van Horn, decided to provide an alternative, and organized the Kansas City Club on November 10, 1882.  Initially, the club met at Kersey Coates's hotel on Quality Hill.  In 1888, the club moved into its first clubhouse, a brick building at the corner of Twelfth and Wyandotte Streets.

In 1922, having absorbed several other clubs, and with a membership of more than 600, the club built a 14-story beaux arts clubhouse (the Kansas City Club Building) at the corner of Thirteenth Street and Baltimore Avenue, designed by local architect, Charles A. Smith.  The clubhouse included a large dining room, several bars, private meeting rooms, a banquet hall, athletic facilities, an indoor pool, six floors of guestrooms, and a rooftop terrace.  The club quickly grew and entered into reciprocal arrangements with many other prominent clubs worldwide.  Membership was opened to women in 1975.

In 1987, the club had 2,180 members. By 2001, however, membership had dwindled to less than 900. The club blamed the drop in membership on the Tax Reform Act of 1986, which made private club dues non-deductible, as well as changes in culture that made young professionals less apt to join clubs. The clubhouse also needed upgrades to its facilities that would have cost between $5 million and $10 million.

Finally, effective July 31, 2001, the club agreed to merge with the University Club, a 100-year-old men's social club at the corner of Ninth Street and Baltimore Avenue, and purchase the University Club's facilities, which were smaller and cost only $1 million to upgrade. The merger also infused the Kansas City Club with the University Club's 200-person membership. In 2002, a developer bought the Kansas City Club's 1922 building and turned it into loft apartments and a banquet hall, renaming it the "Clubhouse on Baltimore."

Since 2010, the club has lent space to Washington University in St. Louis's Olin School of Business local "Executive MBA" program. In November 2012, the club celebrated its 130th anniversary with a charity gala.

The Kansas City Club, after 133 years, closed on Saturday, May 23, 2015. Epoch Developments, from Denver, bought the facility out of bankruptcy in summer 2015 and subsequently spent millions of dollars renovating, improving, upgrading the systems and returning the facility to use as a private venue for corporate gatherings, weddings and still squash or basketball plus a unique golf simulator.

In 2020, the building opened to the public as Hotel Kansas City. The first 5 floors were retained in their original condition and serve as meeting and event spaces.

In popular culture
 On the eighth episode of the third season (2012) of HBO's series Boardwalk Empire, titled "The Pony", Nucky Thompson poses as a member of the Kansas City Club in order to gain access to the Union Club of the City of New York via "a reciprocal agreement" between the two clubs.

Notable members
 Edward H. Allen, 10th Mayor of Kansas City (1867–68)
 Victor B. Bell, lumber magnate
 Richard L. Berkley, 50th Mayor of Kansas City (1979–91)
 Alden J. Blethen, newspaper publisher
 Pasco Bowman, judge, United States Court of Appeals for the Eighth Circuit (1983-2003)
 Omar Bradley, senior U.S. Army field commander in North Africa and Europe during World War II
 Thomas B. Bullene, owner of the Emery, Bird, Thayer Dry Goods Company, 22nd Mayor of Kansas City (1882–83)
 Kersey Coates, early Kansas City hotel magnate
 Harry Darby, U.S. Senator from Kansas (1949–50)
 Dwight D. Eisenhower, 34th President of the United States (1953–61)
 John B. Gage, 45th Mayor of Kansas City (1940–46)
 Ewing Kauffman, pharmaceutical magnate and owner of the Kansas City Royals
 Charles E. Kearney, early railroad magnate
 R. Crosby Kemper, banker and philanthropist
 R. Crosby Kemper Jr., banker and philanthropist
 Robert A. Long, lumber magnate
 August Meyer, mining magnate
 Ralph Leroy Nafziger, founder of Hostess Brands
 Tom Pendergast, Democratic Party political boss
 Charles H. Price II, businessman, U.S. Ambassador to Belgium (1981–83), U.S. Ambassador to the United Kingdom (1983–89)
 James A. Reed, U.S. Senator from Missouri (1911–29), 32nd Mayor of Kansas City (1900–04)
 Jack Steadman, Kansas City Chiefs general manager (1966–76), president (1976–89), chairman (1989-2005), and vice-chairman (2005–07)
 Leander J. Talbott, realtor and politician, 24th Mayor of Kansas City (1884–85)
 Joseph P. Teasdale, 48th Governor of Missouri (1977–81)
 Harry S. Truman, 33rd President of the United States (1945–53), 34th Vice President of the United States (1945), U.S. Senator from Missouri (1935–45)
 Robert T. Van Horn, lawyer, U.S. Representative from Missouri (1865–71), 6th Mayor of Kansas City (1861–62, 1863–65)
 William Warner, lawyer, U.S. Senator from Missouri (1905–11), U.S. Representative from Missouri (1885–89), 13th Mayor of Kansas City (1871–72)
 William L. Webster, 39th Missouri Attorney General (1985–93)
 Charles Evans Whittaker, Associate Justice of the Supreme Court of the United States (1957–62)
 David Wysong, Kansas politician

See also
 List of American gentlemen's clubs
 Kansas City Athletic Club
 Kansas City Country Club
 Missouri Athletic Club

References

External links
 
Link inactive

1882 establishments in Missouri
Athletics clubs in the United States
Organizations based in Kansas City, Missouri
Culture of Kansas City, Missouri
History of Kansas City, Missouri
Sports in the Kansas City metropolitan area
Squash venues in the United States
Gentlemen's clubs in the United States
Organizations established in 1882
Library District (Kansas City, Missouri)